This is a list of airports in Cameroon, sorted by location.

Cameroon, officially the Republic of Cameroon, is a country in west Central Africa. It is bordered by Nigeria to the west; Chad to the northeast; the Central African Republic to the east; and Equatorial Guinea, Gabon, and the Republic of the Congo to the south. Cameroon's coastline lies on the Bight of Biafra (also known as Bight of Bonny), which is part of the Gulf of Guinea and the Atlantic Ocean. Cameroon is divided into ten regions (provinces until 2008). The capital city is Yaoundé.

Airports 

Airport names shown in bold indicate the airport has scheduled service on commercial airlines.

See also 

 Transport in Cameroon
 Cameroon Air Force
 List of airports by ICAO code: F#FK - Cameroon
 Wikipedia: WikiProject Aviation/Airline destination lists: Africa#Cameroon

References

 
  - includes IATA codes
 World Aero Data - ICAO codes and coordinates
 Great Circle Mapper - IATA/ICAO codes and coordinates
 Airport records for Cameroon at Landings.com. Retrieved 2013-08-25

External links
 

 
Cameroon
Airports
Airlines
Cameroon